Qojur (also Romanized as Qojūr; also known as Qujur) is a village in Zarrineh Rud Rural District, Bizineh Rud District, Khodabandeh County, Zanjan Province, Iran. At the 2006 census, its population was 494, in 102 families.

References 

Populated places in Khodabandeh County